Diana Panton is a Canadian jazz vocalist. Her latest album, blue, was awarded the 2023 Silver Disc Award by Japan's Jazz Critique Magazine.  This is Panton's third Silver Disc Award -Yesterday Perhaps and Pink were awarded Silver Discs upon their release in Japan.  blue also earned Panton her eighth JUNO nomination at the 2023 JUNO Awards in Canada.  Panton won a Juno Award for Children's Album of the Year in 2017 for I Believe in Little Things and a 2015 Juno award for Vocal Jazz Album  for RED. She received JUNO nominations for her albums Cheerful Little Earful (2020), Solstice/Equinox (2019), Christmas Kiss (2013), To Brazil with Love (2012) and If the Moon Turns Green...(2009). I Believe in Little Things debuted at #8 on the Billboard Jazz Chart while simultaneously debuting at #11 on the Billboard Children's Music Chart.

Panton started her music career as a member of the Hamilton All-Star Jazz Band. After hearing her perform with this band, multi-instrumentalist Don Thompson invited her to attend the Banff Centre, where he was a faculty member. This led to Thompson's collaboration on Panton's albums a decade later.

Panton holds a Master's degree in French literature from McMaster University and studied Art at the Parsons School in Paris. She teaches French, Art, and Drama at Westdale Secondary School in Hamilton, Ontario.

Discography

References

External links
 

Living people
Canadian women jazz singers
Musicians from Hamilton, Ontario
McMaster University alumni
Juno Award for Children's Album of the Year winners
Juno Award for Vocal Jazz Album of the Year winners
Year of birth missing (living people)
21st-century Canadian women singers